Albert Johnson was a state legislator in Mississippi. He represented Warren County, Mississippi in the Mississippi House of Representatives in 1870 and 1871.

He was born in Kentucky. He was enslaved and worked as a plasterer. In 1868, the Vicksburg Herald newspaper ran an account of an event at which he gave a speech. He was the first African American to serve on Warren County’s Board of Supervisors. He was a Republican. In 1872 the paper reported that Johnson "cow-hides" a "carpetbagger".

He repudiated the view of a local reverend and stated he wanted harmony between blacks and whites.

References

American freedmen
County supervisors in Mississippi
African-American state legislators in Mississippi
People from Warren County, Mississippi
African-American politicians during the Reconstruction Era
Year of birth missing
Year of death missing
Republican Party members of the Mississippi House of Representatives